Mohammad Jamshidi Jafarabadi (born July 30, 1991) is an Iranian professional basketball player who last played for the Meralco Bolts in the Philippine Basketball Association. A 6'6" swingman, he is also a member of the Iranian men's national basketball team.

References

External links
Profile
Review

1991 births
Living people
Asian Games medalists in basketball
Asian Games silver medalists for Iran
Basketball players at the 2014 Asian Games
Basketball players at the 2018 Asian Games
Basketball players at the 2020 Summer Olympics
Iranian men's basketball players
Medalists at the 2014 Asian Games
Medalists at the 2018 Asian Games
Meralco Bolts players
Olympic basketball players of Iran
Petrochimi Bandar Imam BC players
Philippine Basketball Association imports
Shooting guards
Small forwards
2014 FIBA Basketball World Cup players
Iranian expatriate basketball people in the Philippines
2019 FIBA Basketball World Cup players
Shahrdari Gorgan players